The European green lizard (Lacerta viridis) is a large lizard distributed across European midlatitudes from Slovenia and eastern Austria to as far east as the Black Sea coasts of Ukraine and Turkey. It is often seen sunning on rocks or lawns, or sheltering amongst bushes.

Taxonomy
There is an ongoing discussion as to whether Lacerta viridis and Lacerta bilineata are separate species. Genetic data weakly supports their separation into two species but more investigation needs to be done.

Description 
This lizard sometimes sheds its tail (autotomy) to evade the grasp of a predator, regrowing it later.

The male has a larger head and a uniform green coloring punctuated with small spots that are more pronounced upon its back. The throat is bluish in the adult male and to a lesser extent in the female. The female is more slender than the male and has a more uniform coloration, often displaying between two and four light bands bordered by black spots.

Distribution and habitat
The European green lizard is native to southeastern Europe. Its range extends from southern Germany, Austria, Hungary, Czechia, Slovakia, eastern Italy, Slovenia, Croatia, Bosnia & Herzegovina, Serbia, Montenegro, Albania and Greece to southern Ukraine, Romania, Bulgaria and western Turkey. It has been introduced into the state of Kansas in the United States. Various attempts were made to introduce green lizards into Britain since the late 19th century, and a colony identified as L. bilineata has survived at Bournemouth since the late 1990s. They have also been seen and photographed in Jersey, Channel Islands in the last 20 years. In the northern part of its range it may be found on bushy heathland and in the southern part it prefers damp locations.

Behavior
The European green lizard lives on the ground and in low, dense vegetation and likes to bask in the sun, early and late in the day. It feeds mainly on insects and other small invertebrates but it also sometimes takes fruit, birds eggs, fledglings, small lizards and even mice. In spring, the female lays six to twenty eggs which hatch in two to four months. They become mature the following year by which time they will have doubled in size.

Predators 
Predators include red foxes, badgers, domestic cats, birds (such as buzzards, kestrels and crows) and snakes (such as adders).

Status
The IUCN lists the European green lizard as being of "Least Concern". This is because it has a wide range and is common in at least part of that range. It is an adaptable species and no substantial threats have been identified over most of its range. However, in Turkey it may be impacted by the use of pesticides.

References

External links

Lacerta (genus)
Least concern biota of Europe
Lizards of Europe
Reptiles described in 1768
Taxa named by Josephus Nicolaus Laurenti